Kallorkkad (കല്ലൂർക്കാട്) is a village in Ernakulam district, in the Indian state of Kerala. Most of its people are either farmers or engaged in small-scale business.

Location
Kalloorkkad is situated in Muvattupuzha taluk of Kerala State, 13 km from Muvattupuzha, 12 km from Thodupuzha, and 5 km from Vazhakulam. Kalloorkkad village is located on the border of Ernakulam district very near to the Idukki district. The economy reliant on agriculture, and the main cultivations are rubber and pineapple. The village is well connected with towns like Thodupuzha, Muvattupuzha and Kothamangalam through local bus transport and there are some KSRTC buses also present.

Demographics
 census,  had a population of 12838 with 6460 males and 6378 females. The village is mainly made up of Syrian Catholic Christians and Hindus. Muslims are very rare compared to other nearby places. It is a panchayath and it has minor towns such as Nakapuzha, and Kaloor. There are three high schools, two upper primary schools and one higher secondary school. St. Mary's Church Nakapuzha is a famous Marian pilgrim center in Kerala, where many come during the festivals. The festival is from 1 September to 15 September. There are three more churches : Kalloorkad, Thazhuvamkunnu and Kaloor. There is also kalloorkad bhagavathy kshethram kalloorkad sreekrishna swami temple and santhukad (nakapuzha) kshethram.

Government
The place falls under Muvattupuzha assembly constituency, which is part of Idukki (Lok Sabha constituency). It was part of Muvattupuzha (Lok Sabha constituency) until 2004. In Kalloorkad, government services such as the fire station, police station, government hospital, village office, registrar office, treasury, veterinary hospital, krishibhavan, BSNL office, and school are easy accessible.

References

Villages in Ernakulam district